The Boeing 777 is a long-range wide-body twin-engine jet airliner designed and manufactured by Boeing Commercial Airplanes, the commercial business unit of Boeing. Commonly referred to as the "Triple Seven", it is the largest twinjet. Developed in consultation with eight major airlines, the 777 was designed to replace older wide-body airliners and bridge the capacity difference between the 767 and 747.

The 777 is produced in two fuselage lengths. The original 777-200 model first entered service in 1995, followed by the extended-range 777-200ER in 1997.  The stretched 777-300, which is  longer, began service in 1998. The longer-range 777-300ER and 777-200LR variants entered service in 2004 and 2006, respectively, while a freighter version, the 777F, debuted in 2009.

United Airlines first placed the 777 into commercial airline service in 1995. The most successful variant is the 777-300ER with 799 aircraft delivered and over 844 orders to date. Emirates operates the largest 777 fleet with 148 aircraft. FedEx Express operates the largest fleet of the 777F cargo aircraft. As of June 2019, 2,033 Boeing 777s, of all variants, have been ordered and 1,598 have been delivered.

Model summary
United Airlines placed the launch order for the 777 program on October 14, 1990 when it purchased 34 Pratt & Whitney PW4084-powered 777-200s valued at US$11 billion with options on an additional 34. Subsequent versions of the 777, including the 777-200ER, 777-200LR, 777-300, 777-300ER, 777F and the upcoming 777-8X and -9X, have been launched by Air France, British Airways, Cathay Pacific, and Pakistan International Airlines (PIA). The following table lists milestone dates for each model of the aircraft.

Current and future operators

The 777-200 entered into service with United Airlines on June 7, 1995 with its first flight from London Heathrow Airport to Dulles International Airport. From day one, the 777 was awarded 180-minute ETOPS clearance by the Federal Aviation Administration, making it the first airliner to carry an ETOPS-180 clearance into service. This would later be increased to 207 minutes by October 1996. British Airways placed the first model with General Electric GE90-77B engines into service on November 17, 1995. The first Rolls-Royce Trent 877-powered aircraft was delivered to Thai Airways International on March 31, 1996, completing the introduction of the three power-plants initially developed for the airliner.

In July 2009, Emirates surpassed Singapore Airlines as the biggest 777 operator, when the 78th aircraft was delivered. Since 2010, Emirates is the largest Boeing 777 operator, with 152 aircraft; the carrier began phasing out older −200s, −200ERs and −300s in February 2011, but as of May 2011 has 47 additional −300ER orders scheduled for delivery. Other primary operators are United Airlines (96), Qatar Airways (81), Air France (70), American Airlines (67), and Cathay Pacific (65). As of November 2011, 62 airline customers operate variants of the Boeing 777.

The following table lists of active operators of the aircraft as of March 2023.

Government operators

References
Footnotes
 180-minute ETOPS approval was granted to the General Electric GE90-powered 777 on October 3, 1996, and to the Rolls-Royce Trent 800-powered 777 on October 10, 1996.

Citations

Bibliography

External links 

Boeing 777 Orders and Deliveries
Boeing Commercial Orders and Deliveries

777
Operators